"Robert's Rodeo" is the 15th episode of the fourth season of the American sitcom Everybody Loves Raymond (1996–2005). The episode aired on February 7, 2000 on CBS.

Reception 
As Screen Rant stated when placing "Robert's Rodeo" number seven on its list of the best Robert episodes of Everybody Loves Raymond, "While this wacky scenario makes Robert the 'butt' of quite a few jokes, it's also somewhat endearing, as it shows Ray's willingness to go out of his way to help his brother out and be there for him while stuck in the hospital." DVDTalk, reviewing the show's fourth season, praised the arc started by "Robert's Rodeo," which "sets up some great situations and jokes for the season." For his work on "Robert's Rodeo," Mike Berlin was nominated for Outstanding Cinematography for a Multi-Camera Series. Upon the end of Everybody Loves Raymond in 2005, Garrett claimed "Robert's Rodeo" to be one of his favorites of the entire series.

References 

2000 American television episodes
Everybody Loves Raymond episodes